The Taipei City Government (TCG) is the municipal government of Taipei.

History

The Taihoku City Government was founded on 10 October 1920 in Taihoku Prefecture during Japanese colonial rule.  The original city hall was located at the site of the Taihoku City Hall (modern-day Zhongshan Hall) in Zhongzheng District. 

After Taiwan was handed over to the Republic of China on 25 October 1945, Taipei became a provincial municipality and was renamed to Taipei City Government even though the city was the capital city of Taiwan Province but it moved to Zhongxing New Village from 1956. After the Chinese Communist Revolution which was the Chinese Communist Party taking power in mainland China, the Chinese government was forced to retreat to Taiwan and Taipei became the nation's seat of government in 1949. In 1967, Taipei City status was upgraded to a Cabinet-level municipality. Its service thus grew much bigger with the large increase of population. Zhongshan Hall could only accommodate around 1,000 employees and many other units were scattered in various rented offices.

In order to carry the city government jobs effectively, a new Taipei City Hall was built in 1994 in Xinyi District.

Administration
There are 5 internal administrative branches, 22 departments, 7 offices, 4 committees, and 2 public corporations, under the head of the city, the mayor of Taipei and the vice mayor.

Departments 

Cultural Affairs

Rapid Transit System

Administration

Commissions

Public Corporations 
Taipei Water Department
Taipei Rapid Transit Corporation

Access
Taipei City Hall is accessible within walking distance South of Taipei City Hall Station of Taipei Metro.

See also
 Taipei
 Taipei City Council

Notes

Words in native languages

References

External links 

 Taipei City Government 

 
Local governments of the Republic of China